The Women's individual pursuit competition at the 2020 UCI Track Cycling World Championships was held on 29 February 2020.

Results

Qualifying
The qualifying was started at 13:13. The first two riders raced for gold, the third and fourth fastest rider raced for the bronze medal.

Finals
The finals were started at 18:41.

References

Women's individual pursuit
UCI Track Cycling World Championships – Women's individual pursuit